Rachelle Epanga Moseka, known as Rachelle Epanga, is a DR Congolese footballer who plays as a midfielder for the DR Congo women's national team.

Club career
Epanga has played for FC ASR in the Democratic Republic of the Congo.

International career
Epanga capped for the DR Congo at senior level during the 2020 CAF Women's Olympic Qualifying Tournament (third round).

See also
 List of Democratic Republic of the Congo women's international footballers

References

Living people
Democratic Republic of the Congo women's footballers
Women's association football midfielders
Democratic Republic of the Congo women's international footballers
Year of birth missing (living people)